Fauna is the seventh studio album by British progressive metal band Haken. It released on 3 March 2023 through Inside Out Music. The album is the first release without keyboardist Diego Tejeida, who left the band in 2021. Founding member Peter Jones served as his replacement. The first single "Nightingale" was released on 26 April 2022, when the band had not yet started to record the whole album. The second single "The Alphabet of Me" was first announced, along with the cover art and name of the album, at their website with a puzzle game.

Background 

About the origin of the album, singer Ross Jennings said:

The singer added:

Guitarist Richard Henshall followed:

{{cquote|It reminds me of 'The Mountain'. There, we had the idea of not really a narrative-based album, but more the concept of climbing a mountain and overcoming the obstacles along the way. Then we took that and thought about how it could relate to our everyday lives. All of ''Faunas animales relate to us, personally". }}

 Track listing 

 Personnel Haken Ross Jennings – vocals
 Richard Henshall – guitars
 Charlie Griffiths – guitars
 Peter Jones – keyboards
 Conner Green – bass
 Raymond Hearne – drumsProduction and design'''
 Haken – production
 Jens Bogren – mixing
 Tony Lindgren – mastering
 Paul Winstanley – engineering
 Linus Corneliusson – engineering
 Dan Goldsworthy – artwork

Charts

References 

2023 albums
Haken (band) albums
Inside Out Music albums